The Berlin/Brandenburg metropolitan region or capital region is one of eleven metropolitan regions of Germany, consisting of the entire territories of the state of Berlin and the surrounding state of Brandenburg.

The metropolitan region should be distinguished from Berlin's immediate agglomeration, dubbed Berliner Umland which comprises the city and the nearby Brandenburg municipalities. Berliner Umland is significantly smaller and much more densely populated than the metropolitan region, accounting for the vast majority of the region's population over a fraction of its total land area.

Geography
Within the metropolitan region, there is a much smaller and much more densely populated area called Berliner Umland, which comprises the city of Berlin and the immediate Brandenburg municipalities surrounding it. With over 4.46 million people living in its 3,743 km2 area, Berliner Umland accounts for the vast majority (approximately 74%) of the population of the entire metropolitan region over approximately 12% of the entire area. 
The region contains five independent cities – of which the Brandenburg capital Potsdam is the only one with a population greater than 100,000 – and 14 districts (Landkreise). The inhabitants of Berlin and Potsdam account for more than 80 percent of the region's total population. The Brandenburg area is characterized by suburban settlements on the Berlin city limits and small towns in the rural outer area.

Beside Berlin and Potsdam, Berliner Umland comprises the following 67 municipalities: These other communes are listed below, subdivided per district. The municipalities marked with (c) have city status:
Barnim: Ahrensfelde, Bernau(c), Panketal, Rüdnitz, Wandlitz, Werneuchen(c).
Dahme-Spreewald: Bestensee, Eichwalde, Heidesee, Königs Wusterhausen(c), Mittenwalde(c), Schönefeld, Schulzendorf, Wildau, Zeuthen.
Havelland: Brieselang, Dallgow-Döberitz, Falkensee(c), Ketzin(c), Nauen(c), Paulinenaue, Pessin, Retzow, Schönwalde-Glien, Wustermark.
Märkisch-Oderland: Altlandsberg(c), Fredersdorf-Vogelsdorf, Hoppegarten, Neuenhagen, Petershagen-Eggersdorf, Rüdersdorf, Strausberg(c).
Oberhavel: Birkenwerder, Glienicke/Nordbahn, Hennigsdorf(c), Hohen Neuendorf(c), Kremmen(c), Leegebruch, Mühlenbecker Land, Oranienburg(c), Velten.
Oder-Spree: Erkner(c), Fürstenwalde(c), Gosen-Neu Zittau, Grünheide, Langewahl, Rauen, Schöneiche,  Spreenhagen, Woltersdorf
Potsdam-Mittelmark: Beelitz(c), Borkheide, Groß Kreutz, Kleinmachnow, Michendorf, Nuthetal, Schwielowsee, Seddiner See, Stahnsdorf, Teltow(c), Werder(c).
Teltow-Fläming: Blankenfelde-Mahlow, Großbeeren, Ludwigsfelde(c), Rangsdorf, Trebbin(c), Zossen(c).

Centralities
The metropolitan region counts three levels of centralities (Zentralörtliche Gliederung): The metropolis (Metropole) of Berlin, the four upper level regional centres (Oberzentren) of Potsdam, Cottbus, Brandenburg an der Havel and Frankfurt (Oder), as well as 42 secondary centres (Mittelzentren) allocated to 50 towns. 

The Berlin agglomeration comprises the metropolis Berlin, the regional centre of Potsdam and 17 secondary centres:
Bernau
Strausberg
Fürstenwalde
Königs Wusterhausen
Ludwigsfelde
Nauen
Oranienburg
Erkner
Neuenhagen
Zossen
Teltow
Falkensee
Hennigsdorf
Wildau and Schönefeld
Werder and Beelitz

Demographics of Berliner Umland

The following list contains the most populated towns and municipalities in the Berliner Umland:
Berlin (3,517,424)
Potsdam (161,468)
Oranienburg (41,966)
Falkensee (40,900)
Bernau (36,624)
Königs Wusterhausen (34,083)
Fürstenwalde (32,456)
Strausberg (26,156)
Hennigsdorf (25,988)
Blankenfelde-Mahlow (25,934)
Hohen Neuendorf (24,551)
Ludwigsfelde (24,150)
Werder (23,211)
Teltow (23,069)
Wandlitz (21,801)
Kleinmachnow (20,181)
Panketal (19,291)
Zossen (17,717)
Neuenhagen (16,972)
Hoppegarten (16,808)
Nauen (16,804)
Rüdersdorf (15,317)

See also
Metropolitan regions in Germany

Notes and references

External links
 Metropolregion Berlin/Brandenburg (official site)

Havelland (district)
Geography of Berlin
Geography of Brandenburg
Metropolitan areas of Germany